Pratidin Time  is a 24-hour Assamese news channel. The programs of the channel include various infotainment, sports, entertainment, lifestyle, showbiz, fashion, and education.

History
Pratidin Time, is a 24-hour Assamese satellite news channel of Assam, India. It launched on 1 April 2015.  Pratidin Time is a unit of Yash TV Entertainment Pvt. Ltd. The Channel is a sister concern a media network of Assam, which has the highest circulated weekly newspaper Sadin, highest circulated daily newspaper Asomiya Pratidin, highest circulated women's magazine Nandini.

Associated journalists
Nitumoni Saikia, editor-in-chief of this channel.
Mrinal Talukdar, senior journalist

Controversies

In August 2015, Pratidin Time was slammed on social media for airing a report on "scantily clad" women, calling them a summer-time nuisance that went against the local culture. After the massive outrage online, Pratidin Time pulled down the video from its official YouTube channel which was uploaded in May 2015. However, a copy of it with English subtitle went viral on social networking sites. There has also been an online petition to the Assam's Chief Minister Tarun Gogoi to enforce responsible journalism, supported by many including Adil Hussain, Rajni Basumatary
In April 2021, a phone call recording went viral where Minister Pijush Hazarika found threatening a Journalist of Pratidin Time for airing a news related to his wife Aimee Baruah

Programs
Prime Time
Pratidin@5
Abhimat
Bishleshan – Let's Debate
The Big Hour
Morning Prime
Geet

See also
 List of Assamese-language television channels

References

Indian direct broadcast satellite services
Television stations in Guwahati
24-hour television news channels in India
Assamese-language mass media
Television channels and stations established in 2000
Mass media in Assam
Assamese-language television channels